The Lerchenberg (603 m) is a mountain at the northeastern end of the parish of Wildberg (Schwarzwald) in the Black Forest in Baden-Württemberg, Germany.

It lies close to the boundary with the parish of Deckenpfronn. On the mountain is the Lerchenberg Radio Transmitter belonging to the Karlsruhe police.

See also
Transmission site Landespolizeidirektion Karlsruhe

Mountains and hills of Baden-Württemberg
Mountains and hills of the Black Forest
Mountains under 1000 metres